Putney is a district in the London Borough of Wandsworth. It may also refer to:

Places

United Kingdom
Putney (UK Parliament constituency), in London
Putney Bridge bridge over the Thames River

United States
Putney, Connecticut, a neighborhood of Stratford, Connecticut
Putney, Georgia, an unincorporated community
Putney, Kentucky, an unincorporated community
Putney, South Dakota, an unincorporated community
Putney, Vermont, a New England town
Putney (CDP), Vermont, the main village in the town
Putney, West Virginia, an unincorporated community
The Putney School, a private high school located in Putney, Vermont

Elsewhere
Putney, New South Wales, Australia, a suburb of Sydney

People
 Putney Dandridge (1902–1946), American jazz pianist and singer
 Ann-Maree Putney, Australian ten-pin bowler
 J.T. Putney (1928–2001), American race car driver
 John Putney (born 1944), Iowa politician
 Lacey E. Putney (1928–2017), Virginia politician
 Martha Settle Putney (1916–2008), American educator and historian
 Mary Jo Putney, American romance author, also publishing as M.J. Putney
 Michael Putney, American political reporter and columnist
 Michael Putney (bishop) (1946–2014), of the Diocese of Townsville in North Queensland, Australia
 Raphiael Putney (born 1990), American basketball player for Maccabi Haifa of the Israeli National League
 Snell Putney (1929–2009), American sociologist, environmentalist and author
 Trevor Putney (born 1960), English former professional footballer
 Will Putney, American music producer, mixer and engineer
 Hugh Jenkins, Baron Jenkins of Putney (1908–2004), British politician, Labour Party member

Film
 Putney Swope, a 1969 film written and directed by Robert Downey, Sr.

Other
 EMS VCS 3, an early British synthesizer referred to as "The Putney"